Parcoblatta virginica, the Virginia wood cockroach, is a small cockroach species of the genus Parcoblatta, measuring about a centimeter long as an adult.

Description
Adult males of this species like adult males of several other species of Parcoblatta are full winged and orangish in color.  Adult females are brachypterous and can be from rusty brown to almost black.  Nymphs can be brown to black.   Adults and older nymphs usually have a blackish or dark stained head.

Distribution
The distribution of the species is limited to Ontario, Canada and the eastern United States, including Alabama, Connecticut, Florida, Georgia, Indiana, Illinois, Iowa, Kansas, Kentucky, Maine, Maryland, Massachusetts, Michigan, Minnesota, Missouri, Nebraska, New Jersey, New York, North Carolina, Oklahoma, Pennsylvania, Rhode Island, South Dakota, Texas, Vermont, Virginia, and Wisconsin.

Additional images

References

External links
 Drawings from a 1917 article by Morgan Hebard. Plate IV includes a dorsal views of a male and a female of P. virginica (figures 1 and 5), and views of body parts of the male (figure 2-4), with a key to the drawings on page 277.
Black and white photograph  of top view of P. virginica female with partly formed ootheca, from Smithsonian Miscellaneous Collections.

Cockroaches
Insects described in 1865
Taxa named by Carl Brunner von Wattenwyl